Cuba–Ethiopia relations refers to the bilateral relations between Cuba and Ethiopia. Both nations are members of the Non-Aligned Movement and the United Nations.

History
Cuba and Ethiopia established diplomatic relations on 18 July 1975, soon after the Derg obtained power in Ethiopia, abolished the monarchy and embraced communism as an ideology. The Ethiopian Provisional Military Government and Cuba soon established close political relations. In August 1976, both nations opened resident embassies.

In 1977, Somalia was threatening with invading the Ogaden region of Ethiopia with the plan to unify the Somali speaking territories of Ethiopia to Somalia. As war seemed likely between the two nations, Cuban President Fidel Castro paid a visit to both Ethiopia and Somalia in March 1977 to ease tensions between both nations and brought together the leaders of Somalia, Ethiopia and South Yemen and proposed for them to unify and create a greater socialist federal states in the region. However, it was to no avail. Four months later, in July 1977, the Ogaden War began when Somalia invaded Ethiopia. 

Fidel Castro felt that the Somali government had turned its back on socialist ideology and decided to support Ethiopia in the war. Soon after the start of the war, Cuba sent over 15,000 soldiers to the Ogaden region. Their presence, along with Soviet troops and equipment, led to an Ethiopian victory in the war in 1978. In 1989, Ethiopia and Somalia signed a deal recognizing each other's territorial limits and the last Cuban soldiers withdrew from the region, some twelve years after they first arrived. In 1984, the Tiglachin Monument was inaugurated as a memorial in Addis Ababa to the Ethiopian and Cuban soldiers involved in the Ogaden War.

Since the end of Cuban military involvement in Ethiopia; relations between nations have remained close. The Cuban government has maintained annually an allocation of scholarships to Ethiopian students to study in Cuba, in different specialties. More than 5,000 Ethiopian students have graduated from Cuban universities since the 1970s. Each year, the Cuban government also sends doctors to assist in providing services in health institutions in Addis Ababa and Jimma.

Throughout the years, there have been numerous visits between leaders of both nations. In January 2018, Ethiopian President Mulatu Teshome paid a visit to Cuba. In May 2019, Cuban Vice-President Salvador Valdés Mesa paid a visit to Ethiopia. In 2020, both nations celebrated 45 years of diplomatic relations.

Resident diplomatic missions
 Cuba has an embassy in Addis Ababa.
 Ethiopia has an embassy in Havana.

See also
 Eritrean War of Independence
 Ethiopian Civil War

References 

Ethiopia
Cuba